Chollian, (Korean: 천리안, lit. Thousand Li View, clairvoyance) also known as Communication, Ocean and Meteorological Satellite 1 (COMS-1), was a South Korean satellite which was launched on 26 June 2010 and began operations on 1 April 2011. It was operated by the Korea Aerospace Research Institute, who used it for communication, oceanography, and meteorological observation.

COMS-1 was constructed by EADS Astrium, and was based on the Eurostar-3000S satellite bus, bringing together lessons learned from Eurostar satellites and NASA-made GOES satellites respectively. Its single solar array generated a minimum of 2.5 kilowatts of power.

COMS-1 was launched by Arianespace using an Ariane 5 ECA carrier rocket lifting off from ELA-3 at the Guiana Space Centre in Kourou, French Guiana. The first launch attempt occurred on 23 June 2010; the launch was scrubbed due to a problem with one of the rocket's subsystems. A subsequent attempt on 24 June was also scrubbed, due to a problem with the pressurisation of the rocket's fuel tanks. The launch occurred at 21:41 UTC on 26 June 2010. The Saudi Arabian Arabsat-5A satellite was launched by the same rocket, with a SYLDA adaptor being used to separate the spacecraft. Arabsat-5A was mounted atop the SYLDA, with COMS-1 underneath it.

Following launch, COMS-1 separated into a geosynchronous transfer orbit. It used an apogee motor to raise itself into geosynchronous orbit. It then underwent testing before beginning operations at a longitude of 128.2 degrees East on 1 April 2011. Its mission was scheduled to last seven years, though the satellite had a design life of ten years.

COMS-1 was deactivated on 31 March 2020, following a two-year extension of its seven-year primary mission.

As follow-up satellites to Chollian-1, Chollian-2A and Chollian-2B were launched in December 2018 and in February 2020 respectively.

References

Satellites of South Korea
Spacecraft launched in 2010
Spacecraft decommissioned in 2020
Communications satellites in geostationary orbit
Ariane commercial payloads